Albion Excelsior Rugby Club is an amateur rugby club from Gore in the Southland Region of New Zealand. They are affiliated with Rugby Southland.

References

External links

Albion Rugby Club Gore website

New Zealand rugby union teams
Sport in Southland, New Zealand
Gore, New Zealand